The Brazilian mabuya (Brasiliscincus heathi) is a species of skink found in Brazil.

References

Brasiliscincus
Reptiles of Brazil
Endemic fauna of Brazil
Reptiles described in 1951
Taxa named by Karl Patterson Schmidt
Taxa named by Robert F. Inger